Shelly-ann Camille brown  (born March 15, 1980) is a former Canadian bobsledder who has competed since 2006.She was born in Scarborough, Ontario to Jamaican immigrant parents, and also raised in nearby Pickering, Ontario. Brown was recruited to the University of Nebraska on a track and field scholarship, and graduated with a degree in biology and a master's in educational psychology.

Her best finish in the Bobsleigh World Cup was third in the two-man is event at Lake Placid in December 2007. Brown's best finish at the FIBT World Championships was fifth in the two-woman event at Altenberg in 2008.

She won a silver medal in the Two-woman competition at the 2010 Winter Olympics with Helen Upperton. The gold medal was won by fellow Canadians Kaillie Humphries and Heather Moyse. It marked the first time of the 2010 Olympics that Canadians had won two medals in one event.

Brown and Upperton announced their retirements from the sport in September 2012.

References

External links

Profile at Olympic Canada
Official Website

1980 births
Living people
Black Canadian sportspeople
Bobsledders at the 2010 Winter Olympics
Canadian female bobsledders
Canadian people of Jamaican descent
Members of the Order of Canada
Olympic bobsledders of Canada
Olympic silver medalists for Canada
People from Pickering, Ontario
Sportspeople from Scarborough, Toronto
University of Nebraska alumni
Olympic medalists in bobsleigh
Medalists at the 2010 Winter Olympics
Black Canadian sportswomen